The Commonwealth Club, is a private gentlemen's club in Richmond, Virginia, USA. Its present clubhouse was completed in 1891. The defining structure of the Commonwealth Club Historic District, it is located at 401 West Franklin Street. The Commonwealth Club is considered to be one of the finest pieces of architecture in Richmond and was a physical symbol of Richmond's New South movement. The club hosts the annual Richmond German Christmas Dance, the oldest debutante ball in Virginia.

Architecture
After an unsuccessful attempt to acquire plans from local firms, the Board of the Commonwealth Club looked outside of Richmond to develop a style that reflected the momentum of a more national architectural movement. The site proposed for the building, formerly the Palmer House, was located high above the street level. While the board desired a style broadly fashionable, they also desired the building to reflect Richmond as a southern city. The New York City based firm of Carrère and Hastings was chosen from a group of four firms.

The Commonwealth Club is a unique structure among Richmond buildings. Characterized by its deep red brick, brownstone trim and terra cotta cartouches, the building is a combination of Colonial revival and Richardsonian Romanesque styles. The Colonial revival tradition is reflected to promote a heritage for the future and the Richardsonian style reflected the ability of Richmonders to afford an architectural style fashionable on a national level. It is classified by the Virginia Department of Historic Resources as Italian Renaissance Revival.

References

External links
The Commonwealth Club (official site)

1891 establishments in Virginia
Carrère and Hastings buildings
Clubhouses on the National Register of Historic Places in Virginia
Clubs and societies in the United States
Colonial Revival architecture in Virginia
Cultural infrastructure completed in 1891
Gentlemen's clubs in the United States
Historic district contributing properties in Virginia
Italian Renaissance Revival architecture in the United States
National Register of Historic Places in Richmond, Virginia
Renaissance Revival architecture in Virginia
Richardsonian Romanesque architecture in Virginia